Fernando Paes (24 May 1907 – 19 May 1972) was a Portuguese equestrian. He placed ninth in individual dressage, and won a bronze medal in team dressage at the 1948 Summer Olympics in London. He also competed in eventing at the 1948 Olympics. He competed in dressage at the 1952 Summer Olympics in Helsinki.

References

1907 births
1972 deaths
Portuguese male equestrians
Portuguese dressage riders
Olympic equestrians of Portugal
Olympic bronze medalists for Portugal
Equestrians at the 1948 Summer Olympics
Equestrians at the 1952 Summer Olympics
Olympic medalists in equestrian
Medalists at the 1948 Summer Olympics